Deuterodon is a genus of characins from river basins in southern and southeastern Brazil (Rio Grande do Sul to Espírito Santo), with a single species of uncertain taxonomic status, D. potaroensis, from Guyana. They are omnivores with a specialized mouth structure that allows them to scrape algae and debris off bedrock.

Species
The following 24 species are recognized in the genus Deuterodon:

 Deuterodon aphos (Zanata & Akama, 2004)
 Deuterodon burgerai (Zanata & Camelier, 2009)
 Deuterodon giton (Eigenmann, 1908)
 Deuterodon hamatilis (Camelier & Zanata, 2014)
 Deuterodon hastatus (Myers, 1928)
 Deuterodon heterostomus (Eigenmann, 1911)
 Deuterodon iguape C. H. Eigenmann, 1907
 Deuterodon intermedius (Eigenmann, 1908)
 Deuterodon janeiroensis (Eigenmann, 1908)
 Deuterodon langei Travassos, 1957
 Deuterodon longirostris (Steindachner, 1907)
 Deuterodon luetkenii (Boulenger, 1887)
 Deuterodon mutator (Eigenmann, 1909)
 Deuterodon oyakawai (Santos & Castro, 2014)
 Deuterodon parahybae C. H. Eigenmann, 1908
 Deuterodon pelecus (Bertaco & Lucena, 2006)
 Deuterodon potaroensis C. H. Eigenmann, 1909
 Deuterodon ribeirae (Eigenmann, 1911)
 Deuterodon rosae (Steindachner, 1908)
 Deuterodon sazimai (Santos & Castro, 2014) 
 Deuterodon singularis Z. M. S. de Lucena & C. A. S. de Lucena, 1992
 Deuterodon stigmaturus (A. L. Gomes, 1947)
 Deuterodon supparis Z. M. S. de Lucena & C. A. S. de Lucena, 1992
 Deuterodon taeniatus (Jenyns, 1842)

References

Characidae
Taxa named by Carl H. Eigenmann
Fish of South America